Swapnasundari is an Indian dancer, an exponent of Kuchipudi and Bharata Natyam, a choreographer and a vocalist.

She is a recipient of the Padma Bhushan, given Government of India in 2003, as well as the Sahitya Kala Parishad and Sangeet Natak Akademi Award. Her album Janmabhoomi Meri Pyaari was well received. She has written books like The World of Koochipoodi Dance and Tracing the roots of the classical dance. She is the founder-director of Koochipoodi Dance Centre in Delhi.

Born in Chennai she has lived in Andhra Pradesh and Delhi.

Works 
 Vilasini natyam: Bharatam of Telugu temple and court dancers, by Swapnasundari. Swapnasundari, 2010. .

References 

Year of birth missing (living people)
Living people
Artists from Chennai
Dancers from Tamil Nadu
Kuchipudi exponents
Performers of Indian classical dance
Bharatanatyam exponents
Women artists from Tamil Nadu
Indian female classical dancers
Recipients of the Padma Bhushan in arts
Indian choreographers
21st-century Indian dancers
21st-century Indian women artists